El Informador is the name of two Latin American newspapers:

 El Informador (Mexico)
 El Informador (Barquisimeto), Venezuela